Government Polytechnic College, Ambala is a co-educational institution of higher learning located in the town of Ambala in the Ambala region of Haryana. The institute was established in 1929, by the government of India. It was re-established in 1958 is affiliated with the Haryana State Board of Technical Education (HSBTE), Panchkula and approved by All India Council of Technical Education, New Delhi (AICTE) and the Department of Technical Education, Government of Haryana (DTE). It is one of the best in North India. Diploma holders from this institute serve in various government organizations and institutions all over India.

History
Govt Polytechnic, Ambala is situated in the heart of Ambala City.
The Polytechnic institute began as Government/ Industrial School in 1929 later it was developed to Metal Works Institute in 1933 was recognized in 1948 & was thereafter known as Government Technical Institute. In 1958, the Institution was renamed as Government Polytechnic.

Location
It is situated on Ambala City-Chandigarh road at a distance of 1 km from the bus stand, and 8.1 km from the Ambala Cantonment railway junction. The institution is spread over a land area of 24.6 acres.

Departments
 Architecture
 Auto Engineering
 Applied Science
 Civil Engineering
 Computer Engineering
 Electrical Engineering
 Electronics and Communication Engineering
 Mechanical Engineering
 Plastic Engineering
 Training and Placement Cell
 Workshop

Academic programs 
Government Polytechnic College, Ambala awards undergraduate diploma in various engineering fields in a three-year engineering programme. The college also provides the classes of Govt. Polytechnic, Umri in architecture.

Diploma courses

CEGO scheme

The following courses are running under CEGO Scheme:

Scheme of Community Development Through Polytechnics (CDTP)

References

Universities and colleges in Haryana